José Ángel Navarro (1784–1836), known as José Ángel Navarro (the elder), was born in San Antonio de Béxar and became a soldier under Spanish Texas. He was the son of Ángel Navarro, a brother to Texas statesman José Antonio Navarro, and an uncle to Texas legislator José Ángel Navarro III.

Navarro was two-term alcalde (mayor) of San Antonio in Spanish Texas.  As alcalde, he was one of the seven community leaders to sign the December 19, 1832 Béxar Remonstrance, a petition to the Mexican government regarding what they felt was "the historic neglect of San Antonio in particular and Texas in general".

He died June 13, 1836 at his home.

References

External links
Memoria of the Bexar Seven San Antonio de Bexar, 1832-1833, Texas A & M University

1784 births
People of Spanish Texas
Mexican people of Spanish descent
Mexican people of French descent
1836 deaths